The Swearingen SX-300 is a  high-performance homebuilt aircraft, featuring two seats and developed by Ed Swearingen during the 1980s. The aircraft was offered as a kit, but this was not a comprehensive kit like contemporary designs, and its construction was beyond the abilities of the average amateur aircraft builder. The airplane features a  six-cylinder engine.

Specifications (Swearingen SX-300)

Notes

External links

1980s United States sport aircraft
Homebuilt aircraft
Low-wing aircraft
Single-engined tractor aircraft
Aircraft first flown in 1984
Swearingen aircraft